Friend is an EP by the Brooklyn-based band Grizzly Bear, their first release following the critically acclaimed Yellow House. It was released on November 5, 2007 on Warp Records. The EP has tracks recorded during sessions for the Yellow House album, as well as covers of their songs by Band of Horses, CSS and Atlas Sound.

Track listing

Personnel

Grizzly Bear
 Ed Droste – vocals, keyboards, various instruments
 Daniel Rossen – vocals, guitars, various instruments
 Chris Taylor – bass guitar, backing vocals, various instruments
 Christopher Bear – drums, percussion, backing vocals

Additional musicians
 Zach Condon – additional player (1 and 11)
 Dave Longstreth – additional player (1)
 Amber Coffman – additional player (1)
 Lucas Crane – additional player (5)
 CSS – performers (7)
 Band of Horses – performers (8)
 Atlas Sound – performer (9)

Recording personnel
 Chris Taylor – producer, recording
 Daniel Rossen – producer, recording (10)
 Danny Kadar – producer, engineer (8)
 Band of Horses – producer, engineer (8)
 Bradford Cox – producer, recording (9)

Artwork
 Ben Tousley – design
 Amelia Bauer – photography and disc illustration
 Josh Faught – "Friend" banner

Charts

References

External links
 

2007 EPs
Grizzly Bear (band) albums
Albums produced by Chris Taylor (Grizzly Bear musician)
Warp (record label) EPs